Euptychognathus is an extinct genus of dicynodont therapsid. The type species E. bathyrhynchus was first named in 1942 as Dicynodon bathyrhynchus. Fossils of the genus have been recovered from the Usili Formation of the Ruhuhu Basin in Tanzania.

References 

Dicynodonts
Lopingian genus first appearances
Lopingian genus extinctions
Lopingian synapsids of Africa
Fossils of Tanzania
Fossil taxa described in 2011
Anomodont genera